Zarja Kaspija Astrakhan, also known as Dinamo Astrakhan, is a Russian handball team located in Astrakhan. Their home matches are played at the Sports Complex Star. They compete in the Russian Handball Super League.

In reaction to the 2022 Russian invasion of Ukraine, the International Handball Federation banned Russian athletes, and the European Handball Federation suspended the  Russian clubs from competing in European handball competitions.

Accomplishments
Sovietic Liga:
Winners (1) : 1990
Russian Handball Super League:
Runners Up (8) : 2001, 2002, 2003, 2004, 2005, 2006, 2007, 2008
EHF Champions League: 
Semifinalist (1) : 1991
EHF Cup: 
Runner-Up (1) : 2003

European record

Team

Current squad 

Squad for the 2022–23 season

Goalkeepers
 32  Andrei Vereshchagin
 97  Ihar Chernikau
 Left Wingers
2  Albert Gumarov
 24  Mikhail Sharkov
 Right Wingers 
 17  Rufat Mukhtarov
 31  Andrei Gordeev
Line players 
 77  Alexei Chirkov
 95  Vasily Nakonechny

 Left Back 
 23  Arseniy Ukhvarkin
 88  Maxim Vasiliev
Centre Back 
9  Dmitrii Kantemirov
 34  Dmitrii Shelestyukov
Right Back
 14  Valerii Verein
 55  Leonid Kutepov

References

External links

Sport in Astrakhan
Russian handball clubs